is a Japanese footballer who plays for Tokushima Vortis.

Career
Ishii signed in 2008 for Montedio Yamagata, but he joined Tokushima Vortis after seven seasons in Yamagata.

Club career stats
Updated to end of 2018 season.

1Includes Promotion Playoffs to J1.

References

External links
Profile at Tokushima Vortis

1985 births
Living people
Meiji University alumni
Association football people from Chiba Prefecture
Japanese footballers
J1 League players
J2 League players
Montedio Yamagata players
Tokushima Vortis players
Association football defenders